"These Days" is the fourth single, (fifth in the United Kingdom), from the American rock band Foo Fighters' seventh studio album Wasting Light. It was written by Dave Grohl and co-produced by Butch Vig. Dave Grohl has stated that it is his favorite song that he has ever written. On August 18, 2012, the Foo Fighters performed "These Days" at Pukkelpop, as a tribute to the people who either died or were injured there a year earlier, due to a violent thunderstorm that raged over the festival grounds.

Music video
The official video was released on January 30, 2012. The video featured live shots from their June 2011 Milton Keynes performances, Australian and New Zealand tour. It was directed by Wayne Isham.

Reception
The writers of Rolling Stone magazine named it the fourth best single of the year. As of April 9, 2012 "These Days" spent sixteen weeks on the Australian Singles Chart, and was certified gold in Australia.

Charts

Weekly charts

Year-end charts

Certifications

References

Foo Fighters songs
2011 singles
Music videos directed by Wayne Isham
Song recordings produced by Butch Vig
Songs written by Dave Grohl
Songs written by Pat Smear
Songs written by Taylor Hawkins
Songs written by Nate Mendel
Songs written by Chris Shiflett
2011 songs
RCA Records singles